Jan Jacobsz. Schipper (1616-1669) was a bookseller, printer, and theatre poet in Amsterdam.

Personal life
Schipper was born to Jacob Claesz. and Neeltje Leyen in Amsterdam. The surname Schipper is in fact a pseudonym derived from his father’s work as a skipper, and his actual surname is Dommekracht, or Dommescracht.
Not much is known about Schipper’s early life, however he was registered to the Amsterdam bookseller’s guild on 28 October 1636, and married Suzanna Veselaers on 27 August 1650. In 1673 his widow started a printing house with Joseph Athias.

Work
Schipper was best known as the publisher of Calvin, De Brune, and particularly for Cats’ complete works. He was also an accomplished translator of French prose, and a theatre poet in his own right. His most successful works are two plays about the “incomparable” Ariane, which featured the first woman to perform in Amsterdam theatre, Ariane Nooseman.

Notable Works
Alle de Wercken, Cats 1655, 2nd print 1661
Onvergelijkelijke Ariane, Schipper 1644 and 1655
De razende Roelant, Ariosto 1649, tr. Schipper
De bezadigde Roelant, François de Rosset 1649, tr. Schipper
Ariane, Jean Desmarets 1621, tr. Schipper

References

1616 births
1669 deaths
17th-century printers
Businesspeople from Amsterdam
Dutch booksellers
Dutch printers
Dutch translators
Writers from Amsterdam
17th-century Dutch businesspeople
17th-century translators